Brachininae is a subfamily of beetles in the family Carabidae.

Taxonomy
The subfamily contains two tribes and 14 genera.

 Tribe Brachinini Bonelli, 1810
 Aptinoderus Hubenthal, 1919
 Aptinus Bonelli, 1810 
 Brachinulus Basilewsky, 1958
 Brachinus Weber, 1801
 Mastax Fischer von Waldheim, 1828
 Pheropsophus Solier, 1833
 Styphlodromus Basilewsky, 1959
 Styphlomerus Chaudoir, 1875
 Tribe Crepidogastrini Jeannel, 1949
 Brachynillus Reitter, 1904
 Crepidogaster Boheman, 1848
 Crepidogastrillus Basilewsky, 1959
 Crepidogastrinus Basilewsky, 1957
 Crepidolomus Basilewsky, 1959
 Crepidonellus Basilewsky, 1959

References

 
Carabidae subfamilies